Mihai Vihodet (born 6 June 1975) is a Moldovan weightlifter. He competed in the men's heavyweight I event at the 1996 Summer Olympics.

References

1975 births
Living people
Moldovan male weightlifters
Olympic weightlifters of Moldova
Weightlifters at the 1996 Summer Olympics
Place of birth missing (living people)